Philip James Corso (May 22, 1915 – July 16, 1998) was an American Army officer.

He served in the United States Army from February 23, 1942, to March 1, 1963, and earned the rank of lieutenant colonel.

Corso published The Day After Roswell in 1997, about his alleged involvement in the research of extraterrestrial technology recovered from the 1947 Roswell Incident.

On July 23, 1997, he was a guest on the popular late night radio show, Coast to Coast AM with Art Bell where he spoke live about his Roswell story. Corso died of a heart attack less than a year later.

Biography

Military career
After joining the Army in 1942, Corso served in Army Intelligence in Europe, becoming chief of the US Counter Intelligence Corps in Rome.

In 1945, Corso arranged for the safe passage of 10,000 Jewish World War II refugees out of Rome to the British Mandate of Palestine.  He was the personal emissary to Giovanni Battista Montini at the Vatican, later Pope Paul VI, during the period when the "Nazi Rat Lines" were most active.

During the Korean War (1950–1953), Corso performed intelligence duties under General Douglas MacArthur as Chief of the Special Projects branch of the Intelligence Division, Far East Command. One of his primary duties was to keep track of enemy prisoner of war (POW) camps in North Korea. Corso was in charge of investigating the estimated number of U.S. and other United Nations POWs held at each camp and their treatment.

At later hearings in 1992 of the Senate Select Committee on POW/MIA Affairs, Corso testified that he believed hundreds of American POWs were abandoned at these camps. McCain stated that his knowledge obtained from those who had personal relationships with Eisenhower led him to believe that Eisenhower was just not capable of allowing known American POWs to remain incarcerated after the termination of the Korean War.

Corso was on the staff of President Eisenhower's National Security Council for four years (1953–1957).

In 1961, he became Chief of the Pentagon's Foreign Technology desk in Army Research and Development, working under Lt. Gen. Arthur Trudeau.

The Day After Roswell

In his book The Day After Roswell (co-author William J. Birnes), Corso claims he stewarded extraterrestrial artifacts recovered from a crash near Roswell, New Mexico, in 1947.

Corso says a covert government group was assembled under the leadership of Adm. Roscoe H. Hillenkoetter, the first director of Central Intelligence (see Majestic 12). Among its tasks was to collect all information on off-planet technology. The US administration simultaneously discounted the existence of flying saucers in the eyes of the public, Corso says.

According to Corso, the reverse engineering of these artifacts indirectly led to the development of accelerated particle beam devices, fiber optics, lasers, integrated circuit chips and Kevlar material.

In the book, Corso claims the Strategic Defense Initiative (SDI), or "Star Wars", was meant to achieve the destructive capacity of electronic guidance systems in incoming enemy warheads, as well as the disabling of enemy spacecraft, including those of extraterrestrial origin.

Death
Corso died of a heart attack on July 16, 1998.

Gallery

Personal

Files

His service number on his id card was 01047930 as shown on TV.

See also

Roswell Incident

References

Further reading

External links

- Obit - Death
Philip J. Corso - About - Biography
Philip J. Corso - Coast to Coast AM - Biography
Philip J. Corso - Coast to Coast AM - William J. Birnes (interview) 
(Updated) Philip J. Corso Voice Stress Analysis reveals no deception

Space Weapons as Defense - Nexus Magazine vol 13:2 - Michael E. Salla Ph.D
 The Korean War - Tackling the Tough Topics Issue #63 - Darryl Eberhart
Phillip Corso Jr. talking about aliens and ufos

Videos
Disclosure Project - Extraterrestrial Contact and Close Encounter: Part 2 - 2001
Dateline (NBC) -  - 1997
Coast to Coast AM -  - July 23, 1997

1915 births
1998 deaths
20th-century American writers
United States Army personnel of World War II
United States Army personnel of the Korean War
American UFO writers
United States Army officers
Ufologists
Recipients of the Legion of Merit
Warren Commission
Roswell incident
People from California, Pennsylvania
Burials at Florida National Cemetery